Salt Fork may refer to:

Salt Fork (Bonne Femme Creek), a stream in Missouri
Salt Fork Arkansas River in Kansas and Oklahoma
Salt Fork Brazos River in Texas
Salt Fork Red River in Texas and Oklahoma
Salt Fork Vermilion River in Illinois
Salt Fork State Park in Ohio